The Sigmoideomycetaceae are a family of fungi in the Zoopagales order. The family contain contains three genera, and 4 species. The family was circumscribed in 1992.

 Reticulocephalis (2 spp.) putative haustorial parasite of fungi
 Sigmoideomyces (1 sp) putative haustorial parasite of fungi
 Sphondylocephalum (1 sp) haustorial parasite of fungi

References

External links

Zygomycota
Fungus families
Parasitic fungi
Parasites of fungi